The Philippines has competed at every iteration of the ASEAN Para Games which was first held in Kuala Lumpur, Malaysia

All-time medal tally 
Ranking is based on total gold medals earned.

See also 
 Philippines at the Paralympics
 Philippines at the Asian Para Games

References

External links 

ASEAN Para Games